Qolaji-ye Fatabeygi (also Romanized as Qolājī-ye Fatābeygī; also known as Kalāji, Qolājī, and Qollājī) is a village in Mansuri Rural District, Homeyl District, Eslamabad-e Gharb County, Kermanshah Province, Iran. At the 2006 census, its population was 44, in 9 families.

References 

Populated places in Eslamabad-e Gharb County